The Southern Football League (SFL) is an Australian rules football league in South Australia. The League was formed, as the Southern Football Association, in 1886. The league is a not-for-profit organisation.

The league is a suburban competition which also acts as a feeder competition for the South Australian National Football League (SANFL) and in turn the Australian Football League (AFL). Some AFL players from the SFL are Adam Cooney, Nathan Eagleton, Ben Rutten, Dean Brogan and Andrew Mackie. SANFL clubs that have recruitment zones linked to the Southern Football League are West Adelaide Football Club, Glenelg Football Club and South Adelaide Football Club.

Grades 

The SFL consists of:

Former Grades

League history 
The Southern Football League was previously known as the Southern Football Association until 1963.  Originally a country league, with urban expansion it has more recently become a suburban league in Adelaide's far southern suburbs.

The League was formed (as Southern Football Association) in 1886 with competing clubs being Aldinga, McLaren Vale, Sellicks Hill and Willunga. In the early 1900s the participating clubs were Aldinga, Hillside (called McLaren Flat from 1946), McLaren Vale, Morphett Vale, Noarlunga and Willunga.

In 1919 the participating clubs were Aldinga, Hillside, McLaren Vale, Morphett Vale, Noarlunga, Reynella and Willunga.

In 1964 the Association changed its name to Southern Football League and participating clubs were Aldinga, McLaren Flat, McLaren Vale, Morphett Vale, Mount Bold, Myponga, Noarlunga, Port Noarlunga, Reynella, Willunga, Yankalilla and Christies Beach Juniors.

The League came to national attention on 11 July 2009, when an SFL match between Port Noarlunga and Reynella was abandoned as a result of a freak tornado.

The League once again came to attention in 2012 when it cancelled its Junior Carnivals due to umpire abuse and poor spectator behavior.   This led to a campaign based around respect and protection of umpires.

2015 was Edwardstown last season in the league, they transferred to the Channel 9 Adelaide Football League.
2016 was Morphettville Park and Brighton D&OS last season in the league, they transferred to the Channel 9 Adelaide Football League.
2017 Hackham were in recess. Port Noarlunga got ejected from the finals after playing an ineligible player in the semi final.

League Timeline (1922-)

Current Clubs

Former clubs 
Clubs that have previously competed in the league include:

Players Recruited to AFL/VFL

Senior premierships winners

Division 1 

1886–1891 Unknown
1892 Willunga  
1893 Willunga Undefeated  
1894 Willunga 
1895 Willunga 
1896 Sellick's Hill  
1897 Willunga  
1898 Willunga Undefeated  
1899 Willunga Undefeated 
1900 In Recess
1901 Willunga
1902 Willunga
1903 Willunga 
1904 Willunga 
1905 McLaren Vale
1906 McLaren Vale
1907 Sellick's Hill 
1908 McLaren Vale  
1909 Willunga
1910 Willunga
1911 Willunga
1912 Willunga
1913–1914 In Recess
1915 McLaren Vale
1916–1918 In Recess
1919 Willunga
1920 McLaren Vale  
1921 Noarlunga
1922 Noarlunga
1923 Willunga
1924 McLaren Vale
1925 Noarlunga
1926 Noarlunga
1927 Aldinga  
1928 Aldinga
1929 Aldinga
1930 Aldinga 
1931 Aldinga
1932 Aldinga
1933 Hillside 
1934 Aldinga

1935 Hillside
1936 Willunga 
1937 Hillside Undefeated  
1938 Willunga
1939 Hillside Undefeated 
1940 Season Abandoned
1941–1945 In Recess
1946 McLaren Flat  
1947 McLaren Flat 
1948 Willunga 
1949 Willunga
1950 Willunga
1951 Willunga
1952 Willunga 
1953 Myponga
1954 Willunga
1955 Willunga
1956 Willunga
1957 Myponga
1958 McLaren Vale
1959 McLaren Vale
1960 Myponga
1961 Willunga
1962 Yankalilla
1963 Yankalilla
1964 Willunga
1965 Port Noarlunga
1966 McLaren Flat
1967 Christies Beach
1968 Christies Beach
1969 Reynella
1970 Noarlunga
1971 Christies Beach Undefeated
1972 Christies Beach
1973 Port Noarlunga
1974 Christies Beach
1975 Reynella
1976 McLaren Flat
1977 Reynella
1978 Morphett Vale
1979 Morphett Vale
1980 Morphett Vale

1981 Morphett Vale
1982 Noarlunga
1983 Christies Beach
1984 Willunga
1985 Port Noarlunga
1986 Noarlunga
1987 Plympton
1988 Plympton
1989 Plympton
1990 Morphettville Park
1991 Noarlunga
1992 Happy Valley
1993 Happy Valley
1994 Christies Beach
1995 Happy Valley
1996 Happy Valley
1997 Port Noarlunga
1998 Happy Valley
1999 Happy Valley
2000 Marion
2001 Noarlunga
2002 Brighton District and Old Scholars
2003 Happy Valley
2004 Morphett Vale
2005 Morphett Vale
2006 Morphett Vale
2007 Morphett Vale Undefeated
2008 Cove
2009 Morphett Vale  
2010 Reynella  
2011 Brighton Bombers  
2012 Happy Valley  
2013 Reynella  
2014 Noarlunga 
2015 Reynella 
2016 Flagstaff Hill
2017 Flagstaff Hill
2018 Flagstaff Hill
2019 Flagstaff Hill 
2020 Flagstaff Hill Undefeated
2021 Flagstaff Hill Undefeated
2022 Reynella

Division 2 

1977 Reynella C
1978 Morphett Vale C
1979 Morphett Vale C
1980 McLaren Vale
1981 McLaren Vale
1982 Kangarilla
1983 McLaren Flat
1984 Meadows
1985 Flagstaff Hill

1986 O'Sullivan Beach
1987 Kangarilla
1988 McLaren Flat
1989 McLaren Flat
1990 Hackham
1991 Aldinga
1992 Mawson
1993 Aldinga
1994 Meadows

1995 McLaren Vale
1996 O'Sullivan Beach
1997 O'Sullivan Beach
1998 Cove
1999 Kangarilla
2000 Kangarilla
2001 Lonsdale

Mail Medal

Each season the Mail Medal is awarded to the player adjudged the Fairest and Most Brilliant by the umpires on a 3-2-1 match voting system. The Mail Medal is named after the Sunday Mail newspaper.

Ken Donne Medal

The Ken Donne Medal was the equivalent medal awarded for the Division 2 competition between 1977-2001.

125 Year Celebrations

125 Year Team

To celebrate the 125th season of the SFL, the "SFL 125 Year Team" was named in 2011.

Greatest Exports Team

Along with the 125 Year Team, the SFL also announced a team of their "Greatest Exports", a collection of players that had previously played in the SFL but had gone on to achieve at a higher level.  One player, Hendrick "Taffy" Waye was selected in both the 125 Year Team and the Greatest Exports Team.

Key: Adel – Adelaide Crows (AFL), Ald – Aldinga, BDOS – Brighton Bombers/Brighton District and Old Scholars, BrisL – Brisbane Lions (AFL), CB – Christies Beach, Clrmt – Claremont (WAFL), Fitz – Fitzroy (VFL/AFL), FH – Flagstaff Hill, Flat – McLaren Flat/Hillside, Freo – Fremantle (AFL), Glen – Glenelg (SANFL), Glchy – Glenorchy (TANFL/TFL/TSL), GWS –  (AFL), Hack – Hackham, Haw – Hawthorn (VFL/AFL), HV – Happy Valley, Kang – Kangarilla, Mar – Marion, Maw – Lonsdale/Mawson, Melb – Melbourne (AFL/VFL), MV – Morphett Vale, Noar – Noarlunga, Nwd – Norwood (SANFL), NM – North Melbourne/Kangaroos (AFL/VFL), OSB – O'Sullivan Beach, Ply – Plympton, PortM – Port Adelaide (SANFL), PortP – Port Adelaide (AFL), PtN – Port Noarlunga, Rey – Reynella, Rich – Richmond (AFL/VFL), South – South Adelaide (SANFL), Sturt – Sturt (SANFL), Syd – Sydney Swans/South Melbourne (AFL/VFL), Vale – McLaren Vale, WB – Western Bulldogs/Footscray (AFL/VFL), WCE – West Coast (AFL/VFL), West – West Adelaide (SANFL), Will – Willunga, WWT – Woodville-West Torrens (SANFL)

Hall of Fame

The Southern Football League Hall of Fame was established in 2007 in order to provide due recognition to those who have given outstanding service to Australian Football throughout the League history since its establishment in 1886.

Membership is granted to Players, Umpires, Coaches, Administrators, Support Staff and any persons who have provided outstanding service to Australian Football through the Southern Football League or its clubs and, because of the nature of the League, combinations of all types of service is considered.

After the initial inauguration a maximum of five (5) candidates each year are selected by the Hall of Fame Committee for approval by the League Directors.

The general criterion for selection is to have exceptionally served Australian Football through the Southern Football League for a minimum period of 25 years (which do not need to be consecutive).

There may be some exceptions to the general rule and the Hall of Fame Committee shall have the right to nominate these to the Directors for endorsement.

ELITE PLAYERS – Players who have given exceptional service shall be considered (for example the winning of three (3) Mail Medals in "A" Grade is considered exceptional).

SPECIAL SERVICES – Persons who provide special services to Football in exceptional or unusual capacities.

ELITE COACHES – Coaches with exceptional records of coaching within the League.

SFL Hall of Fame Members

Key: Ald – Aldinga, BB – Brighton Bombers/Brighton District and Old Scholars, CB – Christies Beach, Cove – Cove, CSLFUP – Combined Southern Leagues Football Umpires Panel, FH -Flagstaff Hill, Flat – McLaren Flat/Hillside, Hack – Hackham, HV – Happy Valley, Kang – Kangarilla, Mar – Marion, Maw – Lonsdale/Mawson, McL - McLaren, MV – Morphett Vale, MVP – Morphettville Park, Myp - Myponga, Noar – Noarlunga, OSB – O'Sullivan Beach, OSBL – O'Sullivan Beach-Lonsdale, Ply – Plympton, PtN – Port Noarlunga, Rey – Reynella, SFL – Southern Football League/Association, STA - Southern Trainers Association, Vale – McLaren Vale,  Will – Willunga

Grand Finals

Southern Football League 'A' Grade Grand Final 2022
Reynella 9 - 3 - 57 defeated Morphett Vale 6 - 7 - 43Reynella  Goal Kickers: C. Semple 3, B. Potter 2, B. Marshman 2, M. Borholm, N. McLeanMorphett Vale  Goal Kickers: D. Iljcesen 2, D. Williams, B. Hartwig, L. Corrie, D. NobleJ. H. Warren Medal: Cam McGreeUmpires Field: Alex Cornelius, David Popplewell, Darren White 
Boundary: Nathan Rorhlach, Dylan Worrall, Hayden Sutton, Harrison Everett 
Goal: Stephen Young, Jacob CrossfieldVenue: Flinders University Stadium, Noarlunga Centre

Southern Football League 'A' Grade Grand Final 2021Flagtsaff Hill 12 - 11 - 83 defeated Morphett Vale 2 - 5 - 17Flagstaff Hill  Goal Kickers: D. Butcher 3, R. Mountford 2, M. Johnson 2, D. Kearsley, T. Carney, B. Heyward-Ferors, B. Patterson, M. Walton 
Best PLayers, M. Johnson, S. Theraldson, M. Walton, D. Kearsley, A. Shearer, T. CarneyMorphett Vale  Goal Kickers: D. Noble, J. Dal Santo 
Best Players: J. Dal Santo, C. Lock, D. Bode, B. Sowter, J. Dorshorst, A. BakerJ. H. Warren Medal: Mitchell JohnsonUmpires Field: Alex Cornelius, Harry Marshall, Simon Thompson 
Boundary: Mark Ames, Hayden Sutton, Austin Robertson, Nicolas Thompson 
Goal: Joshua Goldswothy, Jacob CrossfieldVenue:  Flinders University Stadium, Noarlunga Centre

Southern Football League 'A' Grade Grand Final 2020Flagstaff Hill 18 - 13 - 121 defeated Noarlunga 9 - 1 - 55Flagstaff Hill  Goal Kickers: D. Butcher 4, S. Smith 3, T. Carney 2, B. Rossi 2, R. Mountford 2, D Kearsley, M. Shearer, B. Heyward-Ferors, N. Beenham, M. Johnson 
Best PLayers: S. Theraldson, D. Kearsley, B. Patterson, B. Rossi, C. Puiatti, D. WebbNoarlunga  Goal Kickers: V. Robertson 3, R. Martell 3, J. Beard, S. Miller, J. Birch 
Best PLayers: V. Robertson, R. Martell, Z. Williams, S. Carlyle, B, GoldfinchJ. H. Warren Medal: David KearsleyUmpires Field: Alex Cornelius, Simon Thompson, Dennis Rice 
Boundary: Joel Stone, Dylan Worrall, Mark Ames, Craig White 
Goal: Darren Hincks, Stephen YoungVenue:  Flinders University Stadium, Noarlunga Centre

Southern Football League 'A' Grade Grand Final 2019Noarlunga 7 - 6 - 48 defeated by Flagstaff Hill 12 - 9 - 81Noarlunga  Goal Kickers: T. Milera 2, N. Mott 2, V. Robertson, T. Mott, R. Martell 
Best PLayers: S. Hamilton, J. Brown, B. Goldfinch, J. ThewlisFlagstaff Hill  Goal Kickers: M. Hollis 3, M. Renfrey 2, S. Smith 2, D. Butcher, S. Osmond, B. Rossi, C. Puiatti, M. Johnson 
Best PLayers: S. Theraldson, D. Kearsley, M. Hollis, M. Renfrey, D. Webb, C. DaviesJ. H. Warren Medal: Mark HollisUmpires Field: David Popplewell, Mark Jensen, Mark Neville 
Boundary: Craig White, Jayden Dunning, James Holmes, Evan Salter 
Goal: Trevor Abblett, Stephen YoungVenue:  Flinders University Stadium, Noarlunga Centre

Southern Football League 'A' Grade Grand Final 2018Flagstaff Hill 21 - 16 - 142 defeated Reynella 6 - 6 - 42Flagstaff Hill  Goal Kickers: J. Vandermeer 4, S. Osmond 3, S. Smith 3, B. Rossi 3, D. Bucher 2, M. Shearer, M. Johnson, A. Albanese, J. Albanese, J. Vandermmer, B. Heyward-Ferors 
Best PLayers: M. Shearer, M. Fazekas, S. Osmond, S. Heatley, S. Theraldson, M. RenfreyReynella  Goal Kickers: B. Lockett 3, C. Semple 3 
Best PLayers: C. Ellison, S. Hamilton, M. Portlock, C. Semple, S. Farrelly, R. MahonyJ. H. Warren Medal: Micahel ShearerUmpires Field: Grant Reilly, Brendon Caruso, Matthew Browne 
Boundary: Liam Trouptsidis, Nathan Rohrlach, Evan Salter, Jayden Dunning 
Goal: Kym Marshall, Stephen YoungVenue:   Flinders University Stadium, Noarlunga Centre

Southern Football League 'A' Grade Grand Final 2017Flagstaff Hill 13 - 16 - 94 defeated Noarlunga 8 - 9 - 57Flagstaff Hill  Goal Kickers: S. Smith 3, D. Buthcer 2, J. Vandermeer, S. Heatley, J. Albanese, M. Shearer, M. Johnson, B. Patterson, S. Osmond, B. Kirk 
Best PLayers: S. Smith, S. Osmond, B. Kirk, M. Hollis, J. Albanese, M. FazekasNoarlunga  Goal Kickers: V. Robertson 3, A. Wurst 2, T. Ferguson 2, S. Carlyle 
Best Players: N. Mott, V. Robertson, S. Carlyle, S. Miller, T. CaudleJ. H. Warren Medal: Samuel OsmondUmpires Field: David Popplewell, Jason Thompson, Jarryd Simister 
Boundary: Kane Marshall, Nathan Rohrlach, Matthew Rohrlach 
Goal: Michael Greer, Scott BrandVenue: Flinders University Stadium, Noarlunga Centre

Southern Football League 'A' Grade Grand Final 2016Flagstaff Hill 7 - 11 - 53 defeated Morphett Vale 6 - 4 - 40Flagstaff Hill  Goal Kickers: M. Raitt 3, J. Vandermeer 2, C. Schorn 2 
Best Players: M. Shearer, S. Theraldson, B. Kirk, J. Vandermeer, D. Kearsley, M. EdwardsMorphett Vale  Goal Kickers: D. Iljcesen 2, S. Byrne, D. Loveridge, N. Baly 
Best PLayers: B. Baly, T. Bennetts, M. Bode, M. Smith, M. Hodge, W. CarrollJ. H. Warren Medal: Michael ShearerVenue:  Flinders University Stadium, Noarlunga Centre

Southern Football League 'A' Grade Grand Final 2015Reynella 18.7-115 defeated Brighton Districts and Old Scholars 8.8-56 Reynella  Goal Kickers: J. McEntee 5, C. Bradwell, C. Ellison, A. Broadbent 3 each, C. Semple, J. Carter, M. Doughty, R. Mahony 1 each
Best Players: L. McEntee, C. Ellison, R. Mahony, R. Frick, A. Broadbent, S. BradshawBrighton Districts and Old Scholars Goal Kickers: J. Carger 2, L. Price, T. Hall, J. Spurling, B. Brookman, E. Drew, T. Hoare 1 each 
Best Players:  W. Rivers, D. De Blaquiere, D. Lang, B. Hillier, E. Drew, J. CargerJ. H. Warren Medal: Luke McEntee(Reynella)Venue:  Hickinbotham Oval, Noarlunga CentreAttendance: 4300

Southern Football League 'A' Grade Grand Final 2014Noarlunga 10.7-67 defeated Reynella 9.9-63 Noarlunga  Goal Kickers: W. Johncock 4, L. Moreen 2, S. Dean, S. Miller, M. Despott, C. Minns 
Best Players: W. Johncock, T. Caudle, S. Miller, S. Dean, M. Despott, C. HudsonReynella Goal Kickers: D. Paddick 2, J. McEntee 2, S. Karran, J. Carter, S. Ward, C. Semple, B. Thompson 
Best Players:  L. Ciampa, D. Paddick, J. Guy, S. Bradshaw, A. Broadbent, B. LockettJ. H. Warren Medal: Waylon Johncock (Noarlunga)Umpires Field: Brendon Caruso, Jarryd Simister 
Boundary: Jarryd Hoppo, Corey Sawtell, Harry Marshall, Darryl Seidel 
Goal: Michael Greer, Darren HinkcsVenue:  Hickinbotham Oval, Noarlunga Centre

Southern Football League 'A' Grade Grand Final 2013Reynella 12.11-83 defeated Morphettville Park 8.10-58 Reynella  Goal Kickers: B. McKeough, C. Semple 3 each, S. Prescott 2, B. Tilley, C. Bradwell, A. Broadbent, S. Karran 1 each
Best Players: D. Lock, J. Farrier, D. Prescott, B. Tilley, J. Guy, M. DoughtyMorphettville Park Goal Kickers: S. Morris 3, D. Longman 2, N. Wiese, S. Wiese, E. Schneider 1 each
Best Players: T. Cranston, S. Morris, S. Talbot, B. Murphy, P. Bennett, J. RuwoldtJ. H. Warren Medal: Jason Farrier (Reynella)Venue:  Hickinbotham Oval, Noarlunga Centre

Southern Football League 'A' Grade Grand Final 2012Happy Valley 14.16-100 defeated Brighton 7.8-50

Happy Valley  Goal Kickers: J. Eagleton 4, J. Hiatt-Harrex 3, D. Sukkel 3, T. Grund, N. Eagleton, N. Petersen-Gray, B. Squire

Best Players: S. McKenzie, J. Brown, M. Mahar, J. Eagleton, A. Huebner.

Brighton Goal Kickers: C. Norsworthy 2, B. King, M. Baker, G. Phillips, M. Pethick, C. Mauger

Best Players: J. Bell, C. Norsworthy, E. Thorpe, M. Baker, T. Alexander, W. Rivers.

Venue:  Hickinbotham Oval, Noarlunga Centre

Southern Football League 'A' Grade Grand Final 2011
BRIGHTON BOMBERS 13.6 (84) defeated MORPHETT VALE 6.9 (45) 

Brighton Bombers Goal Kickers: C. Norsworthy 3, T. Rigney, L. Sharpe 2 each, T. Alexander, W. Rivers, J. Tucker, T. Johnstone, G. Phillips, J. Beugelaar 1 each
Best Players: L. Sharpe, E. Drew, M. Whitford, C. Norsworthy, W. Rivers, T. Johnstone
Morphett Vale
Goal Kickers: S. Byrne 2, K. Hewitt, S. Saunders, N. Bayly, D. Sampson 1 each
Best Players: M. Nadilo, M. Zaluski, D. Earl, B. Bayly, T. Bennetts, S. Hill
Venue: Hickinbotham Oval, Noarlunga Centre

Southern Football League 'A' Grade Grand Final 2010
REYNELLA 13.11 (89) defeated BRIGHTON 9.5 (59)

Reynella 
Goal Kickers: B.McKeough 3, A.Procter 2, E.Ware 2, S.Bradshaw, L.Ciampa, J.Carter, J.Newnham, T.Cece, S.Middleton.  
Best Players: S.Bradshaw, D.Prescott, S.Prescott, E.Ware, J.Baylis, A.Broadbent 
Brighton 
Goal Kickers: J.Tucker 2, B.Brookman 2, W.Bradley, R.Miles, J.Degenhardt, L.Keller, B.King. 
Best Players: J.Rogers, M.Whitford, B.King, R.Miles 
Umpires: Aaron Bennett, David Popplewell
Attendance: 3,600 
Venue:  Hickinbotham Oval, Noarlunga Centre

Southern Football League 'A' Grade Grand Final 2009
MORPHETT VALE 10.13 (73) defeated REYNELLA 5.4 (34)

Morphett Vale Goal Kickers: S.Pollard 6, A.Rigg 1, N.Bayly 1, W.Pittman 1, M.Joraslafsky 1
Best Players: N.Bayly, J.Sampson, S.Pollard
Venue:  Hickinbotham Oval, Noarlunga Centre

Southern Football League 'A' Grade Grand Final 2007
MORPHETT VALE 11.9 (75) defeated BRIGHTON 3.6 (24)

Morphett Vale Goal Kickers: N.Bayly 4, S.Pollard 2, T.Howell 2, S.Lock 1, M.Bode 1, M.Short 1
Best Players: M.Bode, C.Smith, B.Bayly
Venue:  Hickinbotham Oval, Noarlunga Centre

Southern Football League 'A' Grade Grand Final 2006
MORPHETT VALE 14.8 (92) defeated REYNELLA 9.6 (60)

Morphett Vale Goal Kickers: W.Pittman 5, S.Pollard 3, M.Short 1, N.Bayly 1, B.Bayly 1, D.Earl 1, S.Hill 1, J.Kurtz 1Best Players: M.Nadilo, B.Bayly, W.Pittman
Venue:  Hickinbotham Oval, Noarlunga Centre

Southern Football League 'A' Grade Grand Final 2005
MORPHETT VALE 16.13 (109) defeated REYNELLA 10.7 (67)

Morphett Vale Goal Kickers: S.Pollard 3, M.Short 3, R.Beeching 3, A.Hill 2, M.Ritter 2, M.Nadilo 1, A.Landorf 1, D.Earl 1Best Players: A.Hill, M.Zaluski, N.Mitchell
Venue:  Hickinbotham Oval, Noarlunga Centre

Southern Football League 'A' Grade Grand Final 2004
MORPHETT VALE 11.10 (76) defeated BRIGHTON 8.6 (54)

Morphett Vale Goal Kickers: 	S.Pollard 6, A.Stagg 2, A.Landorf 1, C.Smith 1, M.Short 1
Best Players: S.Fishlock, M.Short, S.Pollard
Venue:  Port Noarlunga Oval, Port Noarlunga

Southern Football Association 'A' Grade Grand Final 1952
WILLUNGA 14.10 (94) defeated REYNELLA 9.8 (62) 
Date: 9 September 1952
Best on Ground Trophy: Jim Walding (Willunga)
Venue: Willunga Oval, Willunga

Southern Football Association 'A' Grade Grand Final 1948
WILLUNGA 19.11 (125) defeated McLAREN VALE 8.8 (56)

Willunga 
Best Players: M. Elbourne, H. Haskett, L. Binney
Date: 4 September 1948

Southern Football Association 'A' Grade Grand Final 1947
McLAREN FLAT 11.11 (77) defeated WILLUNGA 9.8 (62)

McLaren Flat Goal Kickers: Robertson 4, Penny 3, Emma 2, N. Chapman, I. Chapman 1 each
Best Players: N. Chapman, D. Wylie, M. Robertson, C. Cameron
Willunga
Goal Kickers: Corbett, Hailstone, Haskett 2 each, W. Aldam, Branson, Halliday 1 each
Best Players: E. McLaughlin, W. Binney, E. Aldam, F. Gage
Date: 6 September 1947
Venue: Aldinga Oval, Aldinga
B-Grade – Willunga defeated McLaren Vale

Southern Football Association 'A' Grade Grand Final 1939
HILLSIDE 13.10 (88) defeated WILLUNGA 8.10 (58)

Hillside Goal Kickers: R. Townsend 5, I. Chapman 3, Holloway, R. Branson, White 2 each, S. Penney 1
Best Players: Holloway, K. Bagshaw, R. Burgan, R. Branson.
Willunga
Goal Kickers: L. Corbett 4, A. Martin, J. Branson, R. Clift, E. Aldam 1 each
Best Players: M. Corbett, R. Clift, J. Little, G. Miller.
Date: 2 September 1939

Southern Football Association 'A' Grade Grand Final 1937
HILLSIDE 17.13 (115) defeated WILLUNGA 9.8 (62)

Hillside Goal Kickers: R. Townsend 5, Robertson 4, K. Bagshaw, Osborne 2 each, Holloway, R. Burgean, Broughton, G. Townsend 
Best Players: Penny, R. Branson, Holloway, K. Bagshaw.
Willunga
Goal Kickers: D. Atkinson, Jones 2 each, Hailstone, L. Corbett, Harris, Dyer, Giles.
Best Players: Dyer, M. Hailstone, Dowling, Blacker.
Date: 4 September 1937

Southern Football Association 'A' Grade Grand Final 1936
WILLUNGA 11.11 (77) defeated HILLSIDE 9.15 (69)

Willunga Goal Kickers: L. Corbett, T. Corbett 3 each, Hailstone 2, Blacker, Little, Atkinson. 
Best Players: Little, M. Corbett, Hailstone, Dowling
Hillside
Goal Kickers: Ward 5, Townsend 2, Wickham, Osmond.
Best Players: K. Bagshaw, Branson, H. Bagshaw, Ward.
Date: 12 September 1936

Southern Football Association 'A' Grade Grand Final 1933
HILLSIDE 15.12 (102) defeated WILLUNGA 4.9 (33)

Hillside Goal Kickers: H. Bagshaw 6, H. Hobbs 5, R. Wickham 3, Ken Bagshaw 1
Best Players: Osmond, Hobbs, Keith Bradshaw, H. Bagshaw
Willunga
Goal Kickers: McKinnon 2, T. Corbett, E. Elbourne 1 each
Best Players: McKinnon, M. Corbett, J. Edwards, Dodd, G. Dyer
Venue: McLaren Vale Oval, McLaren Vale

Southern Football Association 'A' Grade Grand Final 1930
ALDINGA 13.8 (86) defeated McLAREN VALE 9.13 (67) 

Aldinga Goal Kickers: H. Eatts 5, W. Pethick 2, C. Lovelock, L. Lovelock, K. Culley, H. Eatts, V. Branson, R. Stone 1 each
Best Players: H. Leaker, A. Scott, H. Eatts
McLaren Vale
Goal Kickers: F. Maguire 4, R. Freeman, F. Price, E. Roe, P. Roe, R. Hyde 1 each
Best Players: C. Sparrow, E. Martin, M. Harris

Southern Football Association 'A' Grade Challenge Final 1927
ALDINGA 5.13 (43) defeated HILLSIDE 6.6 (36)

Aldinga Best Players: Pethick, H. Gotts, C. Lovelock, L. Lovelock, Leaker, Stone
Hillside Best Players: W. Rowe, Sauerbier, Hugo, Wickham, G. Rowe, Elliot
Date: 26 September 1927
Umpire: Mr. Hill
Best on Ground: W. Rowe (Hillside)
Venue: Willunga Oval, Willunga

Southern Football Association 'A' Grade Challenge Final 1920
MCLAREN VALE 4.5 (29) defeated NOARLUNGA 3.9 (27)

McLaren Vale Best Players: Waye, Waye, W. Murdoch, Samuels, S. Hyde, R. Hunt, F. Price, J. Baldock
Noarlunga Best Players: J. Antonio, P. Furler, R. Furler, W. Furler, H. Asplin, L. Dungey
Date: 4 September 1920
Umpire: C. L. Cornish
Best on Ground: J. Antonio (Noarlunga)
Attendance: 1,000+ 
Venue: Willunga Oval, Willunga

Southern Football Association 'A' Grade Deciding Match 1908
McLAREN VALE 6.11 (47) defeated WILLUNGA 4.6 (30) 

McLaren Vale Best Players: N. King, E. Wheaton, R. Oliver, the Dunstone brothers
Willunga Best Players: S. Waye

Attendance: nearly 1,000 
Venue:  McLaren Vale Oval, McLaren Vale

Southern Football Association 'A' Grade Grand Final 1907
SELLICK'S HILL 6.9 (45) defeated WILLUNGA 4.6 (30) 

Umpire: Mr. Kneebone
Venue:  Aldinga Oval, Aldinga

Southern Football Association 'A' Grade Grand Final 1895
WILLUNGA 4.6 (30) defeated SELLICK’S HILL 2.5 (23)

Result protested by Sellick's Hill  
Result upheld. 
Venue:  Aldinga Oval, Aldinga

J. H. Warren Medal 

The Jim Warren Medal is awarded to the play adjudged Best on Ground in a Southern Football League Division 1 Grand Final.

Leading Goalkickers

Division 1 

The Leading Goalkicker in the Division 1 A-Grade competition is awarded the Herb Metcalf Trophy.

Division 2

Bibliography
 Encyclopedia of South Australian country football clubs compiled by Peter Lines. 
 South Australian country football digest by Peter Lines

Notes

References

External links 
 Southern Football League Official Site
 

 
Australian rules football competitions in South Australia
1886 establishments in Australia